Macroagelaius is a genus of bird in the family Icteridae. 
It contains the following species:
 Golden-tufted mountain grackle (Macroagelaius imthurni)
 Colombian mountain grackle (Macroagelaius subalaris)

 
Icteridae
Taxonomy articles created by Polbot